Thomas Montemage (January 21, 1927 – January 31, 2014) was an American cyclist. He competed at the 1948, 1952 and 1964 Summer Olympics.

References

1927 births
2014 deaths
American male cyclists
Olympic cyclists of the United States
Cyclists at the 1948 Summer Olympics
Cyclists at the 1952 Summer Olympics
Cyclists at the 1964 Summer Olympics
Sportspeople from Buffalo, New York
American track cyclists